Chah Matar (also Romanized as Chāh Matār and Chāh Maţār) is a village in Keybar Rural District, Jolgeh Zozan District, Khaf County, Razavi Khorasan Province, Iran. At the 2006 census, its population was 132, in 30 families.

References 

Populated places in Khaf County